Nature: The Essence Part Three is an album by the American jazz pianist Ahmad Jamal, recorded in France in 1997 and released on the Birdology label.

Critical reception
Richard S. Ginell, in his review for AllMusic, states: "Still pursuing his own muse, Jamal is up to his usual tricks with his hypnotic vamps and feverish runs, as ever refusing to toe the line and sound like everyone else".

Track listing
All compositions by Ahmad Jamal unless noted.
 "If I Find You Again" [Quartet] – 7:52
 "Like Someone in Love" (Johnny Burke, Jimmy Van Heusen) – 6:47
 "Chaperon" – 2:46
 "Devil's in My Den" – 4:59
 "And We Were Lovers" (Jerry Goldsmith) – 3:25
 "Fantastic Vehicle" [Abridged Version] (Joe Kennedy, Jr.) – 4:40
 "The End of a Love Affair" [Abridged Version] (Edward Redding) – 6:57
 "Cabin in the Sky" [Medley] (Harold Arlen, Vernon Duke) – 8:50
 "If I Find You Again" [Duet] – 4:46

Personnel
 Ahmad Jamal – piano
 Othello Molineaux – steel drum
 James Cammack – bass
 Idris Muhammad – drums
 Manolo Badrena – percussion
 Stanley Turrentine – tenor saxophone (track 4)

References 

Atlantic Records albums
Ahmad Jamal albums
1998 albums